Exnaboe, locally referred to as 'bö', is a settlement in the Virkie area of the parish of Dunrossness, South Mainland, Shetland, Scotland, overlooking Sumburgh Airport, and the Pool of Virkie.

Sources
 This article is based on http://shetlopedia.com/Exnaboe a GFDL wiki.

External links

Canmore - Broch of Brough Head site record

Villages in Mainland, Shetland